Cotoneaster humilis is a species of flowering plant in the family Rosaceae. It is native to the northwestern part of the Himalayas, especially Kashmir and Sonamarg districts, where it was found on August 9, 1921.

Description

References

humilis
Flora of West Himalaya
Flora of Pakistan